Sir Thomas Alexander Stewart, KCSI, KCIE (26 February 1888 – 11 May 1964) was a British administrator in India who served as Governor of Bihar.

Educated at George Heriot's School, Edinburgh and Edinburgh University, Stewart entered the Indian Civil Service by examination in 1911. He successively served in the United Provinces, Burma, Madras, Bombay, and with the Government of India in Delhi.

Steward was appointed CSI in 1935, knighted KCIE in 1937, and made a KCSI in 1939.

References

Governors of Bihar
Year of birth missing
Year of death missing
Alumni of the University of Edinburgh
1964 deaths
Indian Civil Service (British India) officers
Knights Commander of the Order of the Star of India
Knights Commander of the Order of the Indian Empire
People educated at George Heriot's School